Martín Pérez may refer to:

 Martín Pérez (artist), Nuyorican artist and musician
 Martín Pérez (baseball) (born 1991), Venezuelan baseball pitcher
 Martín Pérez (politician), Peruvian politician
 Martin Perez (canoer), participated in Canoeing at the 2010 South American Games – Men's K-1 1000 metres
 Martín Pérez de Ayala, Spanish bishop
 Martín Pérez Disalvo (Coscu), Argentine eSports player and singer
 Martín Pérez Guedes, Argentine footballer
 Martín Perezlindo, Argentine footballer